The river Brend is a right-bank tributary of the Fränkische Saale (Franconian Saale), in Lower Franconia, Bavaria, Germany. It is situated in the district Rhön-Grabfeld.

Its source is in Oberweißenbrunn, which is part of the town Bischofsheim. It flows through Bischofsheim, Unterweißenbrunn, Wegfurt, Schönau an der Brend and Brendlorenzen before entering the Fränkische Saale after 30 kilometres in Bad Neustadt.

References

Rivers of Bavaria
Rivers of Germany
Rhön-Grabfeld